Francis or Frank Blake may refer to:

Nobility
 Sir Francis Blake, 1st Baronet, of Twizell Castle (1709–1780), Northumbrian landowner
 Sir Francis Blake, 2nd Baronet, of Twizell Castle (c. 1737–1818), Northumbrian landowner and political writer
 Sir Francis Blake, 3rd Baronet, of Twizell Castle (c. 1774–1860), Northumbrian landowner and politician
 Sir Francis Blake, 1st Baronet, of Tillmouth Park (1856–1940), Member of Parliament
 Sir Francis Blake, 2nd Baronet, of Tillmouth Park (1893–1950)

Science and medicine
 Francis Blake (telephone) (1850–1913), American engineer who improved the carbon microphone for telephone use
 Francis Claude Blake (1867–?), British engineer
 Francis Gilman Blake (1887–1952), American immunologist

Others
 Sir Francis Blake (1638–1718), Member of Parliament for Berwick-Upon-Tweed 1698–1701
 Frank Blake (American football) (fl. 1907–1909), American football coach
 Frank Blake (baseball) (1910–?), American baseball player
 Frank Blake (born 1949), American businessman
 Francis Blake, character from the comic series Blake and Mortimer

See also
 Blake (surname)